The Spirit of Polonia, also known as Solidarity, by Edmund Lewandowski is a sculpture commissioned as part of the fifteenth anniversary of Polanki, the Polish Women's Cultural Club of Milwaukee. Sculpted in 1969, this piece is placed on the South side of the Milwaukee County Courthouse located at 901 North 9th Street in Milwaukee's downtown.

Description
This nine foot, five inch stainless steel sculpture has three rings meaning harmony, unity and infinity.  While the brass sphere represents earth. Each ring is a different size having one inside the other, therefore having each one get smaller, then the "globe" is the smallest.  These sculpture is surrounded by a sixteen-foot, five inch concrete pool.  Both are in front of the Milwaukee County Courthouse.

Information
Edmund Lewandowski was a Polish American and went to Layton School of Art.  He has created multiple outside sculptures, pursued painting, and commissioned multiple advertising ads. The Spirit of Polonia, which is also known as Solidarity was commissioned in 1968 and was created in Clas Park (across the street from The Milwaukee County Courthouse).  In 1979 the sculpture was moved to in front of the Courthouse.

References

Bibliography 
 Lewandowski, Edmund. Rosyjski Sfinks: Rosjanie Wśród Innych Narodów: Edmund Lewandowski. Warszawa: KiW: 1999.

Outdoor sculptures in Milwaukee
Steel sculptures in Indiana
1969 sculptures
Stainless steel sculptures in the United States
1969 establishments in Wisconsin